On February 5, 1946, Charles and Alphonso Ferguson, two African-American men in their 20s, were killed by Joseph Romeika, a 26-year-old white police officer.

Further reading 

 
 
 https://books.google.com/books?id=mWwDEAAAQBAJ&pg=PA40

1946 in New York (state)
1946 deaths
Deaths by firearm in New York (state)
Law enforcement in New York (state)
African Americans shot dead by law enforcement officers in the United States
African-American-related controversies
February 1946 events in the United States
Incidents of violence against men